Nebraska World War II army airfields were major United States Army Air Forces (USAAF) training centers for pilots and aircrews of USAAF fighters and bombers during World War II.  Nebraska was a favored because it has excellent, year-round flying conditions. The sparsely populated land made ideal locations for gunnery, bombing, and training ranges.

As early as September 1940 President Roosevelt's Advisory Commission to the Council of National Defense gathered information on where to place army airfields in the midwestern states. The east and west coasts were thought vulnerable to potential attack, and the midwest was considered a safe place to put defense training sites, manufacturing facilities, and installations.

Through surveys conducted in 1940 and 1941, the USAAF found Nebraska ideal for training purposes. Meteorologists decided that the state had excellent year-round flying conditions. Additionally, Nebraska was lightly populated with large open areas which would provide numerous locations for gunnery, bombing and training ranges. The land was relatively inexpensive. The state was intersected with many reliable railroad lines which could transport troops and material to Airfields and training facilities. Nebraska also had a strong public utilities system, which meant that the United States military would need to deal with few facilities to obtain electricity for airfields and training facilities.

The majority of these airfields were located in rural farmland, near small farming towns.  The effect of stationing thousands of airmen brought the reality of war to rural and small town Nebraska. In addition to providing training for servicemen, the air bases provided jobs for many civilians. Civilians were employed in maintenance, repair, and secretarial work.

Construction of these facilities was based on standardized plans and architectural drawings, with the buildings designed to be the "cheapest, temporary character with structural stability only sufficient to meet the needs of the service which the structure is intended to fulfill during the period of its contemplated war use." To conserve critical materials, most facilities were constructed of wood, concrete, brick, gypsum board and concrete asbestos. Metal was sparsely used. Each facility was designed to be nearly self-sufficient, with not only hangars, but barracks, mess halls, even hospitals and recreation centers

The training that was given to the airmen stationed at these airfields gave them the skills and knowledge that enabled them to enter combat in all theaters of warfare, and enabled the Allies to defeat Nazi Germany and Imperial Japan.

Major airfields
Along with the existing Fort Crook/Offutt Army Airfield, the USAAF established eleven airfields (AAF), the majority of them being under the command of Second Air Force, headquartered in Colorado Springs, Colorado between 1942 and 1945.  These were:

Currently, of the World War II Army Airfields in Nebraska, six are municipal airports
(Ainsworth, Alliance, Scottsbluff, Lincoln, Kearney, Grand Island), four are owned by the Nebraska Department of Aeronautics (three, Harvard, Fairmont and Scribner, are operated as state airfields, and one, Bruning, is not), one is privately owned (McCook) and one became Offutt Air Force Base. Lincoln Airport also hosts a Nebraska Air National Guard unit.

References

  ArmyAirForces.Com
 Maurer, Maurer (1983). Air Force Combat Units Of World War II. Maxwell AFB, Alabama: Office of Air Force History. .

External links
 Nebraska's Army Airfields
  Rural bases

 01
World War II
Airfields of the United States Army Air Forces in the United States by state
United States World War II army airfields